Thomas Drain (born 1880) was a Scottish footballer who played in the Football League for Woolwich Arsenal, Bradford City and Leeds City.

References

Scottish footballers
Arsenal F.C. players
Celtic F.C. players
Bradford City A.F.C. players
Carlisle United F.C. players
Exeter City F.C. players
Leeds City F.C. players
English Football League players
Year of death missing
1880 births
Maybole F.C. players
Association football forwards